DuckTales: Remastered is a Metroidvania-style platform video game developed by WayForward Technologies and published by Capcom. The game is a high-definition remake of DuckTales, a game released on the Nintendo Entertainment System in 1989. It was released for multiple gaming platforms, including Microsoft Windows, the PlayStation 3, the Xbox 360, and the Wii U, over a three-month period between August and November 2013, and later expanded to iOS, Android, and Windows Phone in April 2015. The game was temporarily delisted from digital storefronts in August 2019, but was relisted in March 2020.

The game features a 2.5D presentation with 2D hand-drawn character sprites and 3D modeled levels. Like the original version, the game focuses on Scrooge McDuck traveling across the world in search of five treasures to further increase his fortune. Remastered took one and a half years to make, being developed in late 2011, and features vast enhancements to the original graphics and audio, an expanded storyline, and a full voice cast that includes the original animated series' then-surviving voice actors and actresses.

Remastered received generally positive reviews. Reviewers praised the game for its gameplay and presentation while criticizing the overabundance of story content.

Gameplay

DuckTales: Remastered features a 2.5D presentation, with 2D hand-drawn character sprites and 3D modeled levels. The gameplay of Remastered remains identical to the original DuckTales game, with players taking the role of Scrooge McDuck as he travels across the world in search of five treasures to further increase his fortune. Scrooge can swing his cane to strike or break objects, and bounce on it like a pogo stick to attack enemies from above. This also allows him to reach higher areas, as well as bounce across hazardous areas that would hurt him on foot. Along the way, Scrooge can find various diamonds, found in treasure chests or appearing in certain areas, to increase his fortune and ice cream or cakes that restore his health. Various characters from the series appear throughout the stages with differing roles, aiding or hindering the player's progress. It features the returning voice talents of Alan Young, Chuck McCann, Russi Taylor and Terry McGovern

Some gameplay tweaks are introduced, such as a map screen on easier difficulties and an easier pogo jump, which can be toggled on and off. DuckTales: Remastered also features a new tutorial level set in Scrooge's money bin, which includes a boss fight against Big Time Beagle, as well as a new final level in Mount Vesuvius where both the final boss fight and race to the top take place. Money gathered in levels can now be used to unlock various gallery items such as concept art and pieces of music, and fill up Scrooge's money bin.

The original game's five levels are featured, all of which have been expanded, and can be played in any order. Each one includes new objectives that must be met to complete the stage, and all of the bosses have new patterns. The game also features a full story plot, explaining the motives and reasoning behind each stage, including how Scrooge is able to breathe on the Moon. Characters briefly featured in the original game, such as Magica De Spell, Flintheart Glomgold and the Beagle Boys play a greater role in the game's plot. The original game's hidden treasures are now found only on higher difficulties, and the game consists of only one ending.

Plot 
The Beagle Boys attempt another raid on Scrooge's money bin, with Baggy, Burger and Bouncer Beagle capturing Huey, Dewey and Louie. After Scrooge rescues them, he finds Big Time Beagle in his office with a painting in his hands. With the help of Duckworth, Big Time is defeated and retreats. The painting reveals the locations of five treasures, and Scrooge wastes no time to set out for them. Scrooge and Launchpad visit the Amazon to find the Sceptre of the Incan King. Using eight golden coins, they uncover the hidden temple of Manco Capquack, but the sceptre is lost and the temple is destroyed by its guardian statue. The chief of the natives then approaches Scrooge and Launchpad and thanks them for returning their city to them, and gives Scrooge the recovered sceptre in return, which was just the king's back scratcher. Scrooge, the nephews and Webby visit the castle of Drake Von Vladstone, also known as Dracula Duck, who was the heir to the Coin of the Lost Realm. The boys fall into a trap door and are spread throughout the Transylvanian mansion, but Scrooge saves them from the Beagle Boys, disguised as ghosts. Each of the beagle boys were also carrying a torn sheet of paper which contained part of a riddle. They uncover a mirror where Scrooge solves the riddle, and Magica De Spell reveals herself, who is also after the coin. Scrooge and Magica then face off for it, and the sorceress is defeated and retreats empty-handed. Scrooge and the nephews travel to the African Mines to find the Giant Diamond of the Inner Earth, but they find the workers are being scared off by voices and earthquakes, claiming the mine is haunted. Deep underground, Scrooge discovers that the Terra-Firmians and their games are the cause, and after interfering he is attacked by their king. Defeated, the king makes an agreement with Scrooge to stop the games in exchange for the mining operations to continue, as it will rid them of the diamonds they consider to be "garbage rocks". He gives Scrooge the Giant Diamond of the Inner Earth to start with.

Seeking the Crown of Genghis Khan in the Himalayas, Launchpad crashes into a mountain far from their destination and loses a spare fuel regulator, which is further spread throughout the level by rabbits. While recovering them, Scrooge stumbles upon Bubba the Caveduck who is frozen in ice, and after freeing him and brings him back to the plane, Scrooge discovers that Webby snuck along for the ride. After getting the plane airborne, they are all ambushed by Flintheart Glomgold and the Beagle Boys. After dealing with them, Scrooge confronts an angry Yeti, but Webby interferes and reveals that it was angry because it stepped on a thorn. As Scrooge suspects, the "thorn" is the Crown of Genghis Khan. Scrooge, Gyro Gearloose and Fenton Crackshell travel to the moon to find the Green Cheese of Longevity, able to breathe in space due to a special oxygen taffy Gyro invented, but Fenton is abducted by aliens along with the Gizmoduck suit, and after being saved by Scrooge, he becomes Gizmoduck and blows open a door that leads underground. Glomgold and the Beagle Boys take advantage of the opening, and Gizmoduck goes after Scrooge's rival. Scrooge deals with the Beagle Boys and discovers the cheese before they do, but a rat from the alien ship eats it and mutates. Scrooge defeats the creature, transforming the rat back to normal, and takes the cheese for himself.

After collecting all of the treasures, Scrooge finds the nephews taken hostage by the Beagle Boys and Glomgold, who bargains their safety for the treasures. After Scrooge agrees, Magica De Spell suddenly appears, claiming she was the one who sold Scrooge the painting of Drake Von Vladstone to have him seek the treasures for her, which are part of a spell to revive him. She steals the treasures, turns the Beagle Boys into pigs and kidnaps the nephews, and tells Scrooge to bring her his Number One Dime if he wants to save them. Scrooge and Glomgold form an alliance to respectively save the nephews and retrieve the treasure. After they reach Mount Vesuvius, they eventually find Magica's hidden fortress. Glomgold steals the dime and the two villains reveal they were working together the whole time. Magica successfully revives Dracula Duck and sends him to destroy Scrooge, but he is defeated and perishes. With the nephews saved and the place falling apart, Scrooge goes after Magica and Glomgold, who lose the Number One Dime. Scrooge races against them to retrieve it, succeeds, and narrowly escapes from being caught in the eruption while the two villains escape. Having lost the treasures, Scrooge tells his nephews the adventure was still worth it and they shared it together. Glomgold and the Beagle Boys are arrested, and Scrooge and the nephews leave to celebrate with ice cream cones—and Scrooge declares that he'll splurge just this once and even buy cones with ice cream in them.

Development 

Capcom first announced the game at PAX East 2013 on March 22. While full development of the game started in late 2011, Disney and Capcom were previously discussing the possibility of a remake from 2010. The game's backgrounds and layouts were created by Disney Television artists Mike Peraza and Rick Evans. The game features full voice acting for the characters, including the then surviving members of the original animated series cast, such as Alan Young reprising his role as Scrooge McDuck and June Foray as Magica De Spell.

DuckTales: Remastered features new music composed by Jake Kaufman. In Capcom's "Duckumentary" on the music and sound of the game, Kaufman, on making his arrangements, said: "I've heard this stuff in my head, as arrangements, since I was 10, so I knew exactly what to do, what I would do, if I got the opportunity and I never took it as a fan. And now I'm taking it as a WayForward guy and it sort of developed all together". He did not change the original compositions very much, giving each piece his take on it and made the pieces more orchestral. The game allows players to toggle between the new soundtrack and the original 8-bit soundtrack after clearing the game once, which includes 8-bit renditions of the newly added compositions. Director Austin Ivansmith added about the sound design: "You can't just make it sound like foley from a movie. There are iconic sounds for jumping and landing and hitting an enemy, that they need a certain punch. Our sound designers just know how to make a perfect gameplay sound, and it just adds to the game significantly. Without it, the game just feels empty". He also revealed that there were no initial plans to include voice acting, but Disney stated a few months into development that some of the original voice actors could be enlisted. As such, the team expanded the script to accommodate the addition.

Release 
Capcom released the game in North America on the Nintendo eShop, PlayStation Network, and Steam, on August 13, 2013, and an Xbox Live Arcade version on September 11. On August 20, a retail PlayStation 3 version was released that includes a code to download the title and a DuckTales collector pin. A disc-based version was released on November 12 for PlayStation 3, Xbox 360 and Wii U. The game was released for iOS and Android devices and Windows Phone worldwide in April 2015. Japan got a later release on May 19. A patch was released for the game that addressed various issues and criticisms, including a "Quick Cinema Mode" that skips the in-game cutscenes, provided the player has cleared the game once. The game was given for free to the PlayStation Plus subscribers in January 2015.

For promotion of the game, Capcom sent 150 limited edition, gold NES cartridges with the original game, featuring the Remastered art as the sticker, inside a collectible lunchbox, to different members of the gaming press. Also included were recreated ads for some of Capcom's NES games, such as Mega Man 3, a coupon for the "Green Cheese of Longevity" featured in the game and a fake ad for an upcoming cassette soundtrack from the game. All included items were padded into the box by a ground made of actual, shredded U.S. dollar bills. It was revealed in late August that Capcom was giving the remaining press kits away until the release of the game on Xbox Live, through various contests.

On August 8–9, 2019, the game was temporarily delisted from digital storefronts due to the expiration of Capcom's licensing deal with Disney. For the week ending August 11, the game skyrocketed to third place in the EMEAA sales charts, jumping over 1000 places from the week prior. The game returned to digital storefronts in March 2020.

Reception 

The PlayStation 3, Wii U and iOS versions received "generally favorable reviews", while the Xbox 360 and PC versions received "average" reviews, according to the review aggregation website Metacritic. The game's sales were "over-performing" according to Capcom's fiscal year report.

Game Informers Tim Turi called the PS3 and Xbox 360 versions "a carefully penned love letter that appeals to fans of the ‘80s show" that "blends the cartoon and the NES game together beautifully". Turi added that many of the original game's memorable moments are there but this time they "feel more balanced" and offer up some challenging moments. GamesRadar+s Chris Hoffman called it "a retro revival done right". GameZones Josh Wirtanen praised the game's controls in its preview, saying that they were "incredibly smooth". Later on, Mike Splechta of the same website gave it nine out of ten, calling it "a highly entertaining platformer that oozes personality and excellently difficult gameplay". IGN's Colin Moriarty lauded its faithful gameplay but criticized its focus on storytelling. GameTrailers' Justin Speer praised the gameplay and presentation of the PS3 version while criticizing the story elements for interrupting the flow of the game.

The Escapists Joshua Vanderwall gave the Xbox 360 version four-and-a-half stars out of five and called it "a retro re-release at its finest. The game feels like its classic counterpart, but it has a number of improvements to make it more palatable to a modern gaming audience". The Digital Fixs  Luciano Howard gave it seven out of ten, calling it "a renovated and revitalised golden child which when all is said and done shows its age regardless of the effort imparted to hide such truths". However, Digital Spys Scott Nichols gave the PS3 version three stars out of five: "With DuckTales Remastered, Wayforward attempted to balance authenticity and nostalgia with trying to offer an original experience. The end result feels somewhat confused, getting pulled in both directions at once without ever settling on one or the other". Official Nintendo Magazine gave the WiiU version 62%, stating: "While far from being a bad game, DuckTales Remastered is a huge missed opportunity and a sad day for fans who were expecting so much more". Metros David Jenkins gave the Xbox 360 version five out of ten and called it "a dream come true for fans of the original but there's nothing here for anyone else, especially given the tiresome new story elements and obnoxious difficulty". Edge similarly gave it five out of ten and stated that the game was handled with a care only a fan was able to give, while criticizing the repetitiveness at the same time.

Nominations

Notes

References

External links 
 

2013 video games
Android (operating system) games
Disney video games
Disney games by Capcom
IOS games
Metroidvania games
Nintendo Network games
Platform games
PlayStation 3 games
PlayStation Network games
Single-player video games
Video game remakes
Video games based on DuckTales
Video games scored by Jake Kaufman
Video games developed in the United States
Video games set in Africa
Video games set on the Moon
Video games set in South America
Video games set in Romania
Video games with 2.5D graphics
Video games with cel-shaded animation
Wii U games
Wii U eShop games
Windows games
Windows Phone games
Video games about witchcraft
Xbox 360 games
Xbox 360 Live Arcade games
WayForward games
Products and services discontinued in 2019